Roseville High School is a public high school in Roseville, California, United States. It is a member of the Roseville Joint Union High School District.

History 
Roseville High School was established in 1912. In the beginning of its history, RHS served as the primary high school for Roseville and the surrounding areas. As the population of Placer County increased, many schools were added to the Roseville Joint Union High School District. Today, RHS is one of the five major high schools in Roseville, California and serves many of the residents in central Roseville. Roseville High School was the 2008 Sierra Foothill League Football Champions and CIF Sac-Joaquin Section semi-finalist.

Notable alumni
 Molly Ringwald - American actress
 Evelyn Ashford - five-time medalist in the 100-meter and 4 × 100 m relay and track athlete at five Olympic Games
 Dave Berg - seven-year MLB infielder
 Robbie Bosco - quarterback for BYU during the 1984 and 1985 seasons, and Heisman trophy candidate.
 Tedy Bruschi - linebacker for the New England Patriots and ESPN analyst.
 Rodney Hannah - tight end for the Dallas Cowboys 
 Scott Pruett - NASCAR Driver/Racer
 Kevin Seconds - lead singer, punk rock band 7 Seconds (band)
 Mark and Mike Polish - American screenwriters and film producers
 Megan Dodds - American actress
 Kolton Miller - Oakland Raiders Offensive Tackle
 Jordan Kunaszyk - Washington Football Team Linebacker

References

External links
 Roseville High School Web Page
 Roseville High School Football Facebook Page

Educational institutions established in 1912
High schools in Placer County, California
Public high schools in California
Buildings and structures in Roseville, California
1912 establishments in California